This is the list of cathedrals in the State of Palestine, sorted by denomination.

Status quo

 Church of the Holy Sepulchre in Jerusalem's Old City (home of six denominations: Roman Catholic, Greek Orthodox, Armenian Orthodox, Syriac Orthodox, Coptic Orthodox and Ethiopian Orthodox.)

Eastern Orthodox
Eastern Orthodox cathedrals in Palestine:
 Cathedral Holy Church of Saint James the Brother of the God in Jerusalem (Eastern Orthodox Patriarchate of Jerusalem)
 Holy Trinity Cathedral in Jerusalem (Russian Orthodox)

Oriental Orthodox
Oriental Orthodox cathedrals in Palestine:
 Cathedral of St. James in Jerusalem's Old City (Armenian Apostolic)

Catholic Church
Cathedrals of the Roman Catholic Church in Palestine:
Co-Cathedral of the Most Holy Name of Jesus in Jerusalem's Old City (Latin Rite)
Cathedral of the Annunciation of the Virgin in Jerusalem (Melkite Greek Rite)
Church of St. Thomas in Jerusalem (Syriac Catholic Rite)
Church of Our Lady of the Spasm in Jerusalem (Armenian Catholic Rite)

Anglican
Anglican Cathedrals in Palestine:
 St. George's Cathedral in Jerusalem (of the Episcopal Church in Jerusalem and the Middle East)

See also
 Lists of cathedrals
 Palestinian Christians

References

Cathedrals in the State of Palestine
Palestine
Cathedrals
Cathedrals